Wang Mingxing (born September 5, 1961) is a former female Chinese handball player who competed in the 1984 Summer Olympics and in the 1988 Summer Olympics.

In 1984 she was a member of the Chinese handball team which won the bronze medal. She played all five matches and scored twenty goals.

Four years later she was part of the Chinese team which finished sixth. She played all five matches and scored three goals.

External links
profile

1961 births
Living people
Chinese female handball players
Handball players at the 1984 Summer Olympics
Handball players at the 1988 Summer Olympics
Olympic bronze medalists for China
Olympic handball players of China
Olympic medalists in handball
Medalists at the 1984 Summer Olympics